Mithian Downs is an area south of Mithian in west Cornwall, England.

References

Hamlets in Cornwall